Hipólito Yrigoyen Partido is a county (partido) in Buenos Aires Province, it is located near the centre of the province in central Argentina at coordinates .

People from Hipólito Yrigoyen Partido are known as yrigoyense.

Name
The name  was chosen as a tribute to Hipólito Yrigoyen, who was President of Argentina from 1916 to 1922 and again from 1928 to 1930.

Settlements
Henderson
Herrera Vegas

External links
 Henderson Website

Partidos of Buenos Aires Province